The Boston Athletic Association (B.A.A.) is a non-profit, running-focused, organized sports association for the Greater Boston area. The B.A.A. hosts such events as the Boston Marathon, the B.A.A. 5K, the B.A.A. 10K, the B.A.A. Half Marathon, the B.A.A. Distance Medley (comprising the 5k, 10K, and half marathon events), and the B.A.A. Invitational Mile.

The mission of the B.A.A. to promote a healthy lifestyle through sports, especially running.

History
Among the nation's oldest athletic clubs, the Boston Athletic Association was established on March 15, 1887 under its first president, Robert F. Clark, and with the support of  George Walker Weld and other leading sports enthusiasts, entrepreneurs and politicians of the day.

According to Article II of its 1890 Yearbook Constitution, their objective was to "encourage all manly sports and promote physical culture." The B.A.A. clubhouse on the corner of Exeter and Boylston Streets in Boston's Back Bay was completed in 1888, on the present-day site of the 1970s-era expansion of the Boston Public Library. In addition to such facilities as a gymnasium, bowling alley, billiard hall, Turkish baths and tennis courts, the Association also owned a shooting range and a country club.

Among the active sports of the day were boxing, fencing, water polo and athletics. The club held its first organized track and field competition in 1890 and in 1897 the first famed Boston Marathon took place. A unicorn was chosen as the Association's symbol and appears on the Boston Marathon medals to this day.

The B.A.A. ice hockey team won the United States Amateur Hockey Association championship in the 1922–23 season. Previously, the B.A.A. ice hockey team had played in the American Amateur Hockey League.

In 1936, the original clubhouse was closed due to financial hardship.  The B.A.A.'s current headquarters is at 185 Dartmouth Street. In 1986, John Hancock Financial Services, Inc. assumed major sponsorship of the Boston Marathon. The B.A.A continues to rely on the support of John Hancock and other sponsors and contributors not only with its signature event, the Boston Marathon, but also in its year-round community programming.

Walter A. Brown was the President of the Boston Athletic Association from 1941 to 1964. In 1951, during the height of the Korean War, Brown denied Koreans entry into the Boston Marathon. He stated: "While American soldiers are fighting and dying in Korea, every Korean should be fighting to protect his country instead of training for marathons. As long as the war continues there, we positively will not accept Korean entries for our race on April 19."

The B.A.A. maintains an active running club, organizes the B.A.A. 5K on the weekend of the Boston Marathon, The B.A.A. 10K in June, the B.A.A. Half Marathon in October, and the Mayor's Cup cross country races in Franklin Park in October. The B.A.A. successfully bid to host the 2008 U.S. Olympic Trials Women's Marathon, which was run on the Sunday before the 2008 Boston Marathon.

In January 2016, the B.A.A. purchased an office building just yards from the starting line of the Boston Marathon in Hopkinton, Massachusetts. The office building will be used by the association for the registration of runners and services for various B.A.A. events.

Youth races
The B.A.A. also organizes an annual relay race for Boston-area middle school and high-school-aged runners that takes place on Clarendon Street in Boston.

See also
 Boston Marathon

References

External links

 
Boston Marathon
Massachusetts culture
Sports in Boston
Sports clubs established in 1887
Running clubs in the United States
1887 establishments in Massachusetts
Non-profit organizations based in Boston
Boston Marathon bombing
Athletic Club football teams and seasons